Michael van Gerwen (born 25 April 1989) is a Dutch professional darts player. He is currently ranked number 3 in the world, having been number 1 from 2014 to 2021. He is also a three-time PDC World Champion, having won the title in 2014, 2017 and 2019. Van Gerwen is regarded as one of the best players of all time. 

Van Gerwen began playing darts at the age of 13. He won the 2006 World Masters and threw a televised nine-dart finish at the 2007 Masters of Darts, becoming the youngest player to do both, aged 17. However, after this initial burst onto the darting scene, van Gerwen struggled for consistent form until his breakthrough year in 2012. Improving from world number 38 at the start of 2012 to number four at the beginning of 2013, he won his first major PDC title at the World Grand Prix and reached the final at the 2013 World Championship. In 2014, at the age of 24, van Gerwen became the youngest winner of the PDC World Championship, a record he still holds, as well as being one of only five players to win it more than once. He also holds the record for the highest three-dart average in a televised darts match, with 123.4.

He dominated darts in subsequent years, winning 18 tournaments in 2015 and 25 in 2016. Van Gerwen is the second most successful player in PDC history, behind Phil Taylor. He has won the most PDC Pro Tour events, winning 84 as of July 2022 and as of 19th march 2023 has won 149 PDC titles worldwide.

Early life
Michael van Gerwen was born on 25 April 1989 in Boxtel in the Netherlands. He played football as a defender until he was 12 and began playing darts regularly at 13. He reached the final of the Primus Masters Youth event at the age of 14 in 2003. He then started to amass youth titles in 2005 including the German Open, German Gold Cup, Norway Open, Northern Ireland Open, Swedish Open and the Dutch National Youth Championship; which he also defended in 2006. He also won the Men's events in the Norway and Northern Ireland Opens in the same year that he took the youth titles. Before he became a professional darts player, he worked as a tiler.

BDO career
Van Gerwen picked up several Open titles and rose up the BDO/WDF World Rankings having climbed to third before his 18th birthday. He reached the semi-finals of the Bavaria World Darts Trophy in 2006. Despite losing to Martin Adams, the Dutch youngster came within one dart of the perfect nine-dart finish, just missing double twelve. He did manage the highest possible checkout of 170 during the tournament.

He managed to eclipse that performance at the 2006 Winmau World Masters by becoming the youngest ever champion. Having trailed 1–4 and 2–5 to Adams, he came back to win the title and take Eric Bristow's record as the youngest ever winner at the age of 17 years and 174 days.

His early career success led to speculation that he would join the other professional circuit of darts, the Professional Darts Corporation. However, during the 2006 World Darts Trophy, van Gerwen held a press conference to make it clear that he wanted to stay with the BDO/WDF. He also finished top of the DDF (Dutch Darts Federation) Rankings, which would have secured him a place at the PDC World Championship, if he chose to accept. He had already committed to playing at Lakeside, so the place went to Rico Vonck, who finished second in the rankings.

Van Gerwen was the bookmakers' pre-tournament favourite to win the 2007 Lakeside World title, but his hopes were ended in the first round by Gary Robson. On the night of the 2007 BDO World Championship final, it was announced on Dutch television that Van Gerwen, along with Jelle Klaasen and Vincent van der Voort, would be switching to the Professional Darts Corporation.

PDC career

2007–2011
Van Gerwen started at 88 in the PDC World Rankings. Although he was a BDO player he was eligible for certain PDC events in his home country, even before he switched to the PDC. This included the Open Holland in 2006, in which he took the title. He made his PDC debut on 20 January at the non-televised Stan James Players Championships in Gibraltar and beat Andy Hamilton before losing in the last 16 to fellow countryman Roland Scholten. In the second Players Championship the following day, he beat Raymond van Barneveld in the early rounds only to lose to Alan Warriner-Little in the quarter-finals. He followed up his victory over van Barneveld by beating 13 times World Champion Phil Taylor by 3 sets to 0 on the opening night of the Masters of Darts tournament. All three sets went to a deciding leg which van Gerwen clinched with 14, 12 and 12 darts. He went on to reach the semi-final of the tournament and achieved a perfect nine-dart finish against van Barneveld, but lost the match.

His televised PDC debut came at the 2007 UK Open, where he lost in the last 32 to Colin Osborne. He failed to qualify for the 2007 Las Vegas Desert Classic and was defeated in round two of the World Matchplay in Blackpool by Ronnie Baxter 12–14, having been one leg from victory at 12–10. His first PDC World Championship saw him paired with Phil Taylor in 2008's first round; notably, he had one dart at double 12 to win the match and knock out the 13 time world champion. It would have ended Taylor's phenomenal record of reaching every PDC World Championship Final. Wayne Mardle did end Taylor's run in that year's quarter-finals.

Van Gerwen ended his long wait for a tournament victory by beating his Dutch compatriot Vincent van der Voort 6–3 in the final of the Players Championship in Taunton on 11 April 2009 and earned him £6,000 towards the Order of Merit. Van Gerwen was defeated 6–4 by Arron Monk in the final of the inaugural PDC Under-21 World Championship during the 2011 PDC World Championship.

2012
In the 2012 World Championship, van Gerwen made it to the last 16 for the first time by beating Colin Osborne and Mervyn King. Van Gerwen lost nine out of the first ten legs in his last 16 game to trail 0–3 to Simon Whitlock, but produced an incredible comeback to level the match at 3–3. He couldn't maintain his form, however, as he lost all three legs in the deciding set to exit the tournament 3–4.

Van Gerwen was named Young Player of the Year at the PDC annual awards ceremony on 3 January 2012, for winning four PDC Unicorn Youth Tour events during 2011 and his World Championship run.

In 2012, he won the second UK Open qualifier of the season, defeating Dave Chisnall in the final 6–1. In the UK Open itself he lost in the last 16 to Terry Jenkins. Van Gerwen topped the PDC Youth Tour Order of Merit going into the 2012 PDC World Youth Championship, but went on to lose in the final for a second consecutive year, this time against James Hubbard. Van Gerwen won the eighth Players Championship event in June after beating Simon Whitlock 6–1 in the final. At the World Matchplay, he won 5 legs in a row to record a 10–6 victory over Simon Whitlock in the first round, and then faced a last 16 encounter with Steve Beaton, which he won 13–9 while throwing the fourth nine-dart finish in the tournament's history in the tenth leg. Van Gerwen was 5–11 down in his quarter-final against James Wade, but produced a fightback to only trail 11–12 and then missed one dart to level the game. He went on to lose 13–16.

Van Gerwen's third title of the year came at the 11th Players Championship, where he defeated Ian White 6–1 in the final with a 107.85 average. Van Gerwen was involved in an exceptional match in the last 16 of the European Championship as he was defeated by compatriot Raymond van Barneveld 9–10, despite averaging 104. Another Players Championship success followed with a 6–5 victory over Robert Thornton.

In October 2012, van Gerwen won his first PDC major title at the World Grand Prix. He came from behind to knock out Colin Lloyd 2–1 in the first round, and then beat an out of sorts Adrian Lewis 3–1 in the second. In the quarter-final against Andy Hamilton, he missed four darts to win 3–1, only for Hamilton to take out a 160 finish to force a decider. Van Gerwen maintained his composure and took the final set 3–2 and then heavily out-scored Wes Newton in the semi-finals in a 5–1 win. He played Mervyn King in the final, defeating him 6–4, after being 0–3 and 1–4 down. Van Gerwen afterwards described the win as the best day in his life and in claiming the £100,000 prize he rose to world number eight, overtaking van Barneveld as the highest placed Dutchman. He did not have to wait long for his sixth title of the year, as he won the following week's Players Championship averaging 113 against Jamie Caven in the semi-finals, before beating Nick Fullwell 6–3 in the final.

In a Championship League game, van Gerwen averaged an incredible 121.86 whilst defeating Steve Beaton 6–0. He won six of his seven league matches to finish top of the table, but then lost 5–6 to the same opponent in the semi-finals. He soon returned to winning ways by taking another Players Championship title, coming back from 0–4 in the final against Ian White to triumph 6–5.

Van Gerwen won all three of his group games at the Grand Slam of Darts to top Group B and face Phil Taylor in the last 16, in a match billed as a clash between the current best two players in the world. There, van Gerwen ended a five-year, 15-game losing streak against Taylor to defeat him 10–5 with a 108.38 average in a performance he described as the best of his career. He played Scott Waites in the quarter-finals, who himself had already beaten Taylor in the tournament, and produced another superb display as he hit two 170 finishes and an average of 106.63 in a 16–12 win. He averaged over 100 once more to defeat Dean Winstanley 16–8 in the semi-finals, to set up a clash in the final against compatriot and five-time world champion Raymond van Barneveld. Van Gerwen was never ahead in the final and couldn't quite match the heavy scoring and clinical finishing he had produced earlier in the tournament as he was beaten 14–16.

His eighth tournament win of 2012 came at the 20th and final Players Championship, where he beat Taylor for the first time in a final and also beat reigning world champion Adrian Lewis in the semi-finals. He was 4–5 down to Taylor, but produced back-to-back finishes of 164 and 124 to win and in doing so finished third on the ProTour Order of Merit to qualify for the Finals. Van Gerwen went out of the Finals in the second round 8–10 to Andy Hamilton despite winning the first four legs of the match.

2013
After his exceptional year in 2012, van Gerwen entered the 2013 World Championship as the second favourite behind Phil Taylor. He saw off Paul Lim 3–0 in the first round to play Peter Wright in the second round, who described van Gerwen as "not good enough" before the match. 
Van Gerwen was 0–2 down but stormed back by winning 12 of the next 14 legs to advance with a 4–2 win and then beat Colin Lloyd 4–1 in the third round to face reigning two-time world champion Adrian Lewis in the quarter-finals. The match was a classic as both players averaged over 100, with Lewis coming back from a set down four times to level the match at 4–4. In the deciding set, Lewis missed two darts at double top for the match, as van Gerwen stepped in to finish 83, 108 and double four in successive legs to seal the win and progress to the semi-final. At 3–1 up in his semi-final match against James Wade, van Gerwen hit a nine-dart finish. He almost repeated the feat in the very next leg, after hitting eight perfect darts before missing one dart at double 12 that would have seen him become the first player ever to hit back-to-back perfect legs. However, he lost the set and the next as Wade leveled the match, but van Gerwen's superior scoring power eventually told as he won the match 6–4. In his first World Championship final, he played fifteen-time winner Phil Taylor and led 2–0 and 4–2, but crucially missed two darts to lead 5–2. Taylor then rallied to win five successive sets to take the title 7–4. Van Gerwen's run in the tournament saw him climb to number four on the Order of Merit, which guaranteed his place in the Premier League for the first time.

At the PDC awards dinner in January 2013, van Gerwen won three awards; Young Player of the Year, PDPA Player of the Year and Fans' Player of the Year. In his first World Cup of Darts, he partnered van Barneveld and the Dutch pair suffered a shock in the last 16 when they were beaten 3–5 by the Finnish duo of Jani Haavisto and Jarkko Komula. Van Gerwen won his first tournament of 2013 at the first UK Open Qualifier of the year with a 6–2 victory over Dave Chisnall in the final. He completed a weekend double a day later by defeating Brendan Dolan also by a 6–2 scoreline in the second Qualifier. The win saw van Gerwen replace Wade as the world number three. His run continued by taking the third event with a 6–2 win against Michael Smith. Van Gerwen's first defeat on the 2013 Pro Tour came a day later when Robert Thornton beat him 4–6 in the semi-finals of the fourth Qualifier. His unbeaten run stood at 29 matches until this defeat. Despite losing in the semi-finals of the European Darts Trophy to Paul Nicholson in April, van Gerwen replaced Adrian Lewis as the world number two. He reached another final at the fifth UK Open Qualifier, beating Phil Taylor 6–2 along the way, but lost 1–6 to Simon Whitlock. Van Gerwen bounced back a day later to win the sixth event which included a 112.67 average in a 6–1 win over Michael Smith in the semi-finals and a 6–5 defeat of Kim Huybrechts in the final. He also won the final event with a 6–0 ten-minute thrashing of Mervyn King in the final, meaning he had won five of the eight Qualifiers. His sixth title of the year came a week later at the second Players Championship by beating Stuart Kellett 6–1 in the final.

In the 2013 Premier League, van Gerwen became the first player other than Phil Taylor to finish top of the league after Taylor had done it in all eight previous stagings of the event. He won 11, drew two and lost three of his 16 games, averaging over 100 in nine of them. He beat James Wade 8–4 in the semi-finals to face Taylor in the final. Van Gerwen was 2–5 down but then won five unanswered legs before Taylor stopped the rot by taking out a finish of 65. In the next leg, van Gerwen declined a dart at the bull when on a finish of 87 to set up 32, but Taylor stepped in to finish 160 to level the match at 7–7. However, van Gerwen began the 15th leg with a 180 and won two consecutive legs to move within one game of the title. He missed two darts at double eight to win 10–7, but with Taylor leaving 40 after 12 darts in the next, van Gerwen finished 132 on the bull to become only the fourth player to win the Premier League.

Van Gerwen's play continued as he won the European Darts Open in Düsseldorf, Germany, saving his best performance for the final where he beat Simon Whitlock 6–2 with an average of 106.68. Another title followed less than a week later as he won the non-ranking Dubai Darts Masters, taking out finishes of 170 and 164 during an 11–7 triumph over Raymond van Barneveld in the final. His 10th tournament win came in June at the Austrian Darts Open by beating Mervyn King 6–3 in the final. It was van Gerwen's fifth title in a row and he was on a run of 24 unbeaten games. He was the number one seed for the UK Open having earned £35,600 in the eight qualifying events, just over £25,000 ahead of Robert Thornton in second place. Van Gerwen stretched his unbeaten streak to 27 games before he met Taylor in the quarter-finals. Van Gerwen did not quite produce his best game as he was beaten 7–10.
 Two weeks later he won the sixth Players Championship by defeating Andy Hamilton 6–1 in the final. At the Gibraltar Darts Trophy his unbeaten run of 15 matches in European Tour events was ended as he lost to Adrian Lewis 5–6 in the quarter-finals.

At the European Championship, van Gerwen beat Mervyn King and Jelle Klaasen both with 104 averages, but was defeated 8–11 by Lewis in the semi-finals. Lewis was also the victor when the two met at the same stage of the World Matchplay, beating van Gerwen 17–15. Van Gerwen overcame Lewis in the semi-finals of the Sydney Darts Masters 10–7, but was then defeated 10–3 in the final by Taylor. In the defence of his World Grand Prix title, van Gerwen swept past John Part 2–0 and van Barneveld 3–0 in 21 minutes to play Dave Chisnall in the quarter-finals. Van Gerwen came from 2–0 down to level the match but Chisnall halted his momentum by winning the final set by three legs to one. He qualified from Group 5 of the Championship League having lost in the final of two previous groups which included a nine-dart finish in a 6–5 loss to Terry Jenkins in Group 4.

In the Winners Group, van Gerwen was the only player to beat Taylor and he finished second in the table by winning five of his seven games. In the semi-finals, he saw off Richie Burnett 6–2 to face Taylor in the final. Van Gerwen fell 5–0 down before winning three successive legs but had left himself too much to do and lost 6–3. He finished the year as the top seed for the Players Championship Finals having amassed £125,350 during the year in ProTour events, over £50,000 ahead of Chisnall in second place. He produced two superb comebacks in the event, the first coming in the second round when he took six legs in a row to see off Lewis 9–6. He produced the second in the final as from 6–3 down he hit a seven leg burst against Taylor and secured his second major title of the year with an 11–7 victory.

2014
In the 2014 World Championship, van Gerwen began with victories over qualifier Zoran Lerchbacher and Kevin McDine. He trailed Gary Anderson 3–1 in the third round, but came back to win 4–3. He then faced former BDO World Champion Mark Webster, whom he beat 5–3, to set up a semi-final meeting against Adrian Lewis.

Van Gerwen won with a 6–0 whitewash and an average of 103.02, having punished Lewis for a multitude of missed doubles during the match. In his second successive World Championship final, he faced Peter Wright and stormed into a 4–0 lead, before Wright took the next two sets. Van Gerwen made it 6–2, needing one set to win but his scoring and finishing then faltered, as Wright took the next two sets to make it 6–4. Van Gerwen took advantage of two missed darts from Wright in the deciding leg of the next set to win 7–4. He became the sixth different winner of the event and, at the age of 24, the youngest as well as jumping above Phil Taylor to become the new world number one. Later in the month, he won the ProTour Player of the Year, Fans' Player of the Year and PDC Player of the Year at the Annual Awards.

On the opening night of the Premier League, van Gerwen registered the first ever whitewash over Taylor in the tournament's history, 7–0 in 13 minutes with an average of 109.59. He enjoyed a title success in his home country at the Dutch Darts Masters by beating Mervyn King in a high quality final where both players averaged over 107. A week later, he won the final UK Open Qualifier with a 6–0 whitewash over Michael Smith. At the UK Open, he was beaten 10–8 in the semi-finals by Terry Jenkins. Van Gerwen won his 20th title on the PDC tour in claiming the second Players Championship by beating Dean Winstanley 6–1. In April, Taylor won their reverse fixture in the Premier League 7–4 and was also the victor when the two met in the final of the German Darts Masters. He finished top of the Premier League table for the second year in a row, winning 11 of his 16 games, and then edged past Gary Anderson 8–7 in the semi-finals. From 5–5 in the final, Raymond van Barneveld took four successive legs and ended van Gerwen's Premier League reign with a 10–6 win. He defended his Dubai Duty Free Darts Masters title by seeing off Wright 11–7.

At the World Cup of Darts, van Gerwen and van Barneveld produced a sensational 117.88 average in their doubles decider against Northern Ireland to whitewash them 4–0 and meet England's Taylor and Lewis in the final. Van Gerwen defeated Taylor 4–0 and van Barneveld recorded the same scoreline against Lewis. He went into his singles match versus Lewis knowing a win would earn the Dutch pair the title and he did so with a 4–2 success.

Van Gerwen played in his first World Matchplay final this year but couldn't match Taylor's fast start to the match as he trailed 7–1 and 11–2 and, despite a rally to pull back to 14–8, he was beaten 18–9. The loss left van Gerwen in tears on the stage afterwards. He returned to claim the inaugural Singapore Darts Masters with an 11–8 victory over Simon Whitlock. A week later he averaged an incredible 118.21 in beating Paul Nicholson 8–3 in the quarter-finals of the Perth Darts Masters and went on to reach the final where Taylor beat him 11–9. Van Gerwen also won the 14th Players Championship with a 6–4 victory over Michael Smith. A week later, they contested the final of the European Darts Trophy, with van Gerwen losing 6–5 having been 3–0 ahead. He lost in a deciding leg once more at the 15th Players Championship, to Justin Pipe.

His second major title of the year came at the World Grand Prix as he edged a close final against James Wade 5–3 in sets. Seven days later, he beat Wade once more this time 6–2 in the final of the 18th Players Championship. He averaged 111 in eliminating Dave Chisnall 10–5 in the quarter-finals of the European Championship and then threw his fourth career televised nine-darter during an 11–6 semi-final victory over van Barneveld. Van Gerwen took the first five legs in the final against Terry Jenkins and never looked back as he sealed his sixth PDC major title 11–4. He was knocked out of the quarter-finals at the Grand Slam 16–10 by Kim Huybrechts and in the second round of the Players Championship Finals 10–7 by Terry Jenkins.

2015
Van Gerwen reached the semi-finals of the 2015 World Championship, which included his then highest World Championship average of 105.26 in beating Robert Thornton in the quarters. He played Gary Anderson in the event for the second year in a row and once again trailed 3–1 before levelling at 3–3. However, he missed four darts to take the next set and instead saw his reign as world champion come to end with a 6–3 loss. Van Gerwen won the Masters by beating van Barneveld 11–6 in the final with an average of 112.49. He lost in the final of the first UK Open Qualifier 6–1 to Adrian Lewis, but atoned for this a day later by winning the second event by beating Vincent van der Voort 6–3. Van Gerwen also took the third event with a 6–1 triumph over James Wade which meant he had won 25 of 26 matches since the World Championship. He extended this to 30 out of 31 games when he won the German Darts Championship by defeating Anderson 6–2 in the final with an exceptional average of 117.94. Jelle Klaasen missed a total of ten match darts in the final of the fourth UK Open Qualifier to allow van Gerwen to win 6–5. A 31 consecutive game winning streak was ended by Terry Jenkins the next day.

In the UK Open fifth round, he set his highest televised average of 114.91 during a 9–2 victory over Kim Huybrechts in which he had a 170 finish and missed one dart for a nine-darter in the final leg. He went on to win his first UK Open title with an 11–5 victory over Peter Wright in the final. He won his second European Tour event in a row at the Gibraltar Darts Trophy with a 6–3 success over Terry Jenkins and made it a trio of titles by seeing off John Henderson 6–5 at the German Darts Masters, which saw him become the second player ever to reach £1 million in prize money on the PDC Order of Merit, after Phil Taylor. He reset his highest televised average record to 116.90 in a 7–0 whitewash of James Wade in the Premier League. Van Gerwen continued to dominate the PDC circuit by claiming the fourth and sixth Players Championship events with 6–1 and 6–5 wins over Lewis and Wade respectively. A 6–6 draw with Dave Chisnall ensured he would finish top of the Premier League for the third year in a row. He averaged 105.15 during the 172 legs he played during the league phase. Van Gerwen won five legs in a row from 7–4 down to van Barneveld in the semi-finals which helped him win 10–8. He could only take out 32% of his doubles in the final against Anderson, including missing seven in one leg, which contributed to him losing 11–7. Van Gerwen maintained his unbeaten record in the Dubai Darts Masters as he took his third title in a row by recovering from 8–6 down in the final against Taylor to triumph 11–8. He stretched his unbeaten run to 20 matches in European Tour events as he claimed the Dutch Darts Masters by whitewashing Justin Pipe 6–0. Van Gerwen and van Barneveld were knocked out in the semi-finals of the World Cup in a doubles match against Scotland's Anderson and Wright.

Van Gerwen won his first World Matchplay title by beating James Wade 18–12. It saw him overtake Wade as the PDC's second most successful player with nine major tournament wins, but still a long way behind Taylor who leads with 79. Michael Smith defeated van Gerwen 6–2 in the final of the European Darts Trophy, but he took the European Darts Matchplay seven days later with a 6–4 success over Chisnall in the final. Van Gerwen hit 18 180s in the final of the World Grand Prix against Robert Thornton, but ultimately missed too many doubles to be edged out 5–4 in sets. He looked set to lose a second successive major final when he trailed Gary Anderson 10–7 at the European Championship, but won the next four legs without allowing the Scot a dart for the match to win 11–10. It marked the first time van Gerwen had retained a major title.

Van Gerwen was untroubled in reaching the final of the Grand Slam which included a 16–4 victory over Kim Huybrechts in the quarter-finals whilst averaging 111.05. In the final, he was 3–0 and 7–3 behind Taylor, but won six unanswered legs and went on to take the tournament with a 16–13 win. The title completed van Gerwen's set of winning all of the PDC's current majors during his career. In the final of the World Series of Darts Finals, van Gerwen came from 10–9 down to defeat Wright 11–10 with a 129 checkout and an 11-dart leg. He took his fourth televised title in a row at the Players Championship Finals with an 11–6 win over Adrian Lewis. It also ensured he had featured in every televised final since the World Championship at the start of the year.

2016
After needing a tie-break to beat René Eidams in the first round of the 2016 World Championship, Van Gerwen recorded 109.23, the fourth-highest average ever recorded in the event during a 4–0 whitewash over Darren Webster. In the third round, he took out a 135 finish to send his tie with van Barneveld to a deciding set. Van Barneveld went 2–0 up in legs before van Gerwen threw a 10-dart leg, but he missed one dart to level the game in the next leg allowing his Dutch rival to finish on 96 to knock him out. Van Gerwen's average of 105.78 was at the time the highest ever to lose a match in the history of the event. Phil Taylor missed seven match darts in the semi-finals of the Masters and van Gerwen took full advantage to eliminate him 11–10 and retained his title by easing past Dave Chisnall 11–6. In week four of the Premier League, van Gerwen broke the televised average record with 123.40 in a 7–1 win over Michael Smith. In the following round of fixtures, he averaged 116.67 in beating Peter Wright 7–2. A 7–5 win over Taylor saw van Gerwen top the final Premier League table for the fourth year in a row. He won his second Premier League title (his first being in 2013) with an 11–3 victory over Taylor in what was van Gerwen's fourth consecutive Premier League final. Taylor had led 2–1 but van Gerwen soon took control of proceedings and won ten of the following eleven legs to complete a resounding win.

Van Gerwen had won three of the six UK Open Qualifiers and in the fourth round of the main event he produced his fifth televised nine-dart finish whilst defeating Rob Cross 9–5. He also hit 170 finishes in the leg before and after the perfect leg. He recovered from 4–1 down to Taylor in the semi-finals to win 10–6 and, in a repeat of last year's final, bested Wright 11–4 to retain his title. Van Gerwen won his second consecutive World Matchplay title with a comfortable 18–10 win over Taylor. It was 15-time winner Taylor's first defeat in a Matchplay final and only his eighth defeat in the tournament since 1994. He did suffer an 11–5 loss to Taylor in the final of the inaugural Champions League of Darts, but then set a record average in a World Grand Prix final of 100.29 as he beat Anderson 5–2.

Van Gerwen claimed six of the ten European Tour events, five Players Championships and two World Series tournaments, as well as taking the main event of each of these tours, the European Championship (averaged 111.62 in an 11–1 victory over Mensur Suljović), the World Series of Darts (beat Peter Wright 11–9) and the Players Championship Finals (overcame Dave Chisnall 11–3).
He also retained his Grand Slam crown courtesy of seeing off James Wade 16–8 in the final. His domination of the PDC circuit saw him win a total of 25 titles and £1.5 million in 2016, with a match success rate of 91%.

2017

Van Gerwen averaged over 100 in each of his four matches as he advanced to the semi-finals of the 2017 World Championship without facing a player in the top 20 on the Order of Merit. Raymond van Barneveld won the first set without reply in the semis, but van Gerwen then produced the greatest ever World Championship performance as he averaged a tournament record 114.05 (32 legs) in a 6–2 win. It beat Phil Taylor's previous best of 111.21 (23 legs) in the second round of the 2002 World Championship. In the last set, van Gerwen missed a dart at double 12 for a nine-darter. In the final, Gary Anderson left 28 to take a 3–1 lead, but van Gerwen finished 86 to snipe that set, leveling the match at 2–2. Van Gerwen ultimately took 12 of the next 14 legs to establish a 6–2 lead. He got over the line to take his second World Championship crown with a 7–3 win. With this victory, he held all seven PDC major ranking titles at the same time. 42 180s were thrown in the final, the most ever in a darts match and van Gerwen's average of 107.79 brought his average over the whole tournament to 106.32. The win cemented his number one ranking as he was over £1 million ahead of second placed Anderson.

Van Gerwen won his third successive Masters title by defeating Anderson 11–7 in the final, finishing with a 109.42 average. Van Gerwen threw two nine-darters during his third round 6–2 win over Ryan Murray at the fourth UK Open Qualifier and he would take the title by beating Anderson 6–3 in the decider. He could not defend his UK Open title because he was forced to withdraw from the event due to a back injury. In the 2017 edition of the Premier League, van Gerwen successfully defended his title, topping the table of the league stage once again by winning nine matches, drawing four and losing two. After overcoming Anderson 10–7 in the semi-final, he would go on to face Peter Wright in the final. The Scotsman was leading 7–2 but van Gerwen staged a remarkable comeback to level at 8–8. Wright then had the title for the taking at 10–9, but missed six consecutive match darts to allow van Gerwen to again level and a 12-dart leg against the throw gave the Dutchman his third Premier League title, with a tournament average of 104.76. At the World Cup, Netherlands secured their first title since 2014 by seeing off the Welsh pairing of Gerwyn Price and Mark Webster 3–1 in the final.

At the 2017 World Matchplay in July, van Gerwen failed in his attempt to retain the title he won in 2016. He eased to wins over Stephen Bunting 10–4 and Simon Whitlock 11–3 but suffered a heavy 16–6 defeat at the hands of Phil Taylor in the quarter finals. At the Champions League of Darts in Cardiff, van Gerwen failed to get out of the group stages he lost his opening match 10–5 to Raymond van Barneveld. He then defeated Adrian Lewis 10–4 meaning he needed to win his final group game against Phil Taylor without losing 7 legs in the match. Van Gerwen went on to lose 10–9.

At the 2017 World Grand Prix in October, the tournament in which van Gerwen claimed his maiden PDC Major televised title in 2012, van Gerwen suffered a surprise first round exit to Scotsman John Henderson 2 sets to 1 it marked the first time van Gerwen had lost in the opening round in the event since 2009 he was bidding to win the tournament for the fourth time in six years.

Following early exits in the Champions League and the World Grand Prix, van Gerwen went back to winning ways by claiming his 4th European Championship title by defeating Rob Cross 11–7. Notably in his semi-final clash with Kyle Anderson, van Gerwen was on the receiving end of a 9 darter and his Australian opponent had missed two match darts to progress to the final but the Dutchman prevailed, winning 11–10.

Van Gerwen's next tournament was the Grand Slam of Darts, winning all 3 of his group games to top Group A. He defeated Steve Lennon in the last 16 by a convincing 10–3 win. Van Gerwen followed this by defeating Rob Cross 16–13 in the quarter-finals, a 16–8 win over 6 time Grand Slam winner Phil Taylor in the semi-finals and a 16–12 win over Peter Wright in the final to claim his 3rd Grand Slam title.

2018
Van Gerwen won his first two matches in the 2018 World Championship against Christian Kist and James Wilson respectively. In his third round match against Price, van Gerwen won 4–2 despite losing seven legs in a row. In the quarter-final, van Gerwen faced Raymond van Barneveld. Van Gerwen led 4 sets to 3 and was throwing first in set 8, but van Barneveld took out 84 in the fifth leg of that set after van Gerwen had missed one match dart at double 12. This clutch finish sent the match to a deciding set. With the ninth set level at 1 leg each, van Barneveld missed three darts at double 16 to move within one leg of the match, and van Gerwen stepped in to finish 96 to break. Van Gerwen held his throw in the subsequent leg to win the match 5–4. In the semi-final, van Gerwen faced World Championship debutant Rob Cross. The first eight sets went with throw, then van Gerwen broke to go 5–4 ahead. In set 10, with van Gerwen throwing first, he lost his throw to fall behind two legs to one. He then missed six darts to send the set into a fifth leg (In which he would have been throwing for the match), allowing Cross to step in to level the match at five sets apiece. The first four legs of the deciding set were shared to send the set into a tie-break. The next four legs went with throw (Although Cross did miss one match dart at the bullseye to win the set 4–2), then van Gerwen broke to go 5–4 up. He then missed five shots at a double to win the match, before Cross sent the match into a sudden death last leg. After Cross won the bull-off to gain the throw, he missed double 16 for a match-winning 140 checkout. This allowed van Gerwen one last gasp at a finish of 108. He got a shot at double 16, but couldn't take it, which was his sixth missed match dart. Cross put the match to rest by hitting double eight to win the sudden death last leg, stunning van Gerwen 6 sets to 5.

His next televised tournament was the Masters, where he took his fourth consecutive win at the tournament beating his compatriot Raymond van Barneveld in the final with a 105 average, after earlier wins over Gary Anderson, James Wade and Kim Huybrechts. At the first Pro Tour event of 2018, UK Open Qualifier 1, he beat Michael Smith in the final, averaging 105 for the tournament. He took his hundredth PDC singles title at the next UK Open Qualifier with a win over Darren Webster in the final, becoming the second player to do so after Phil Taylor. He lost at the quarter final stage of the third qualifier to Smith, putting his earnings from the qualifiers over £20,000. Despite sitting out the final three qualifiers, his performances at the first three events was enough for him to top the UK Open Order of Merit and enter at the third round of the tournament. Drawn against Jeffrey de Zwaan, he lost 8–10 with a 96 average. This was the first time since 2012 he exited before the quarter final stage at the tournament, and the first time he lost his first match of a televised tournament since the World Grand Prix the year prior.

After sitting out both Players Championship 3 and Players Championship 4, he returned to form with his third Players Championship of the year and sixth 2018 title overall with a 6–2 victory over Chris Dobey in Players Championship 5. On the following day, he lost to Jermaine Wattimena in Players Championship 6, his earliest loss since he was beaten by Vincent van der Voort at the same stage of Players Championship 19 in 2017.

At the first European Tour event of 2018, the European Darts Open, he took his 21st European Tour title with an 8–7 victory over Peter Wright. Van Gerwen and Wright would play each other again in the final of the 2018 German Darts Grand Prix, with van Gerwen prevailing once again by a scoreline of 8–5. It was his 22nd European Tour title.

After sitting out of Players Championships 7 and 8 he attempted to win his third European Tour title of the season but was beaten in the quarter-finals 2–6 by Ian White. He pulled out of the Austrian Open (the 4th European Tour event) but then returned to winning ways in Players Championship 9 by beating Scott Taylor 6–4 in the final. Van Gerwen played in the 10th Players Championship where he was beaten 4–6 by Jonny Clayton in the quarter-finals.

Van Gerwen won the European Darts Grand Prix, his 23rd European Tour title and his 10th title of the year that included wins over Dave Chisnall in quarter-finals by a scoreline of 6–4, a 7–0 whitewash over Michael Smith in the semi-finals and an 8–3 victory over James Wade in the final. The following week, he won his 11th title of the year (his 24th European Tour title) by winning his 5th consecutive Dutch Darts Masters by beating Steve Lennon 8–5 in the final. Notably, in his semi-final match with Daryl Gurney, van Gerwen trailed 2–6 as well as surviving 3 match darts but the Dutchman produced a comeback performance to knock out the Northern Irishman 7–6.

His 12th title of the year followed shortly after on 17 May in winning the Premier League by beating Rob Cross 10–6 in the semi-finals and a comprehensive 11–4 victory over Michael Smith in the final with an average of 112.37, the highest ever average in a Premier League final. It was his 3rd consecutive Premier League title and his 4th Premier League title overall.

The first World Series of Darts event of 2018, the German Masters, saw a loss to Dimitri Van Den Bergh in the quarter-finals. His 13th title of the year would follow shortly after in the World Cup of Darts with partner Raymond van Barneveld. They successfully defended their title for The Netherlands with a 3–1 victory over Scottish pairing Peter Wright and Gary Anderson. The following weekend saw him win his 14th title of the year and his 25th European Tour title with a victory in the Gibraltar Darts Trophy by beating Adrian Lewis 8–3 in the final with an average of over 108.

2 weeks later saw a surprising defeat to Brendan Dolan in round 3 of the Danish Open. The following week he was back to winning ways with his 15th title of the year and his 26th European Tour title in the European Matchplay with an 8–2 victory over William O'Connor in the final. He also threw the first nine-dart finish in over 5 years on the European Tour in his 2nd round match against Ryan Joyce.

Van Gerwen's reign as the US Masters and Shanghai Darts Masters champion would come to end as he suffered loses to James Wade 3–8 in the quarter finals  and to Michael Smith 4–8 in the semi-finals respectively.

Van Gerwen's next televised tournament was the World Matchplay. Drawn against Jeffrey de Zwaan in the first round, van Gerwen lost 6–10 to his compatriot. It was van Gerwen's 2nd loss to de Zwaan following his previous defeat at the UK Open back in March.

Van Gerwen returned to the winning circle by claiming his first World Series of Darts title of 2018 by defeating compatriot Raymond van Barneveld 11–4 at the final of the Auckland Darts Masters final. It was van Gerwen's 16th title of 2018.

Van Gerwen lifted the 2018 World Grand Prix title, the fourth time he had won that title, with a 5–2 win over Peter Wright. He failed to retain the European Championship, World Series Finals and Grand Slam titles in 2018, and lost the final of the 2018 Players Championship Finals to Daryl Gurney.

2019

Van Gerwen was top seed at the 2019 World Championship. He knocked Alan Tabern out in the second round despite having beer thrown at him during the walk on, before consecutive 4–1 victories over Max Hopp and former world champion Adrian Lewis. He beat Ryan Joyce 5–1 in the quarter-final to set up a semi-final with Gary Anderson. A dominant semi-final performance by the Dutchman saw him triumph 6–1 over Anderson, to reach the final against Michael Smith. He regained the world championship with a 7–3 win over Smith.

Van Gerwen kicked off the 2019 circuit with winning the 2019 Masters, defeating James Wade 11–5 in the final to secure his fifth consecutive Masters title. The next two weeks, van Gerwen won Players Championship 1 and 3, henceforth breaking Phil Taylor's ProTour title record. 

He retained his Premier League title yet again, beating Daryl Gurney 10–7 in the semifinals, and beating Rob Cross 11–5 in the final. The first two World Series events of 2019 did not go well for him, suffering an 8–6 defeat to Michael Smith in the quarterfinals of the 2019 US Darts Masters, and blowing a 5–1 lead to lose 6–5 to qualifier Martin Schindler in the first round of the 2019 German Darts Masters. Van Gerwen then continued his very poor run of form at the World Matchplay, losing 13–11 to Glen Durrant in the last 16. Van Gerwen once again failed to get out of the quarterfinals in the 2019 Brisbane Darts Masters, losing 8–5 to Gurney. He finally got back to winning ways in Melbourne and New Zealand, winning those finals by scores of 8–3 and 8–1 over Gurney and Van Barneveld respectively.

Van Gerwen retained his World Grand Prix title with a win over Dave Chisnall, and won the Champions League of Darts for the first time, recovering from three legs down to beat Peter Wright 11–10. He regained his Players Championship Finals title, beating Gerwyn Price in the final, and hitting the only televised nine-dart finish of the year, in the second round against Adrian Lewis.

2020
Van Gerwen was again top seed at the 2020 World Championship. He easily reached the quarter-final, recovering from losing the first set to Jelle Klaasen in the second round to win, before consecutive 4–0 victories over Ricky Evans and former BDO World Champion Stephen Bunting. In the quarter-final, he triumphed over Darius Labanauskas, 5–2, to qualify for the semi-final for the seventh time in eight championships. There he beat Nathan Aspinall 6–3 to set up a final with Peter Wright. Van Gerwen was defeated in that final, 7–3. 

At the 2020 Masters, van Gerwen lost in the first round to Jonny Clayton, ending his run of five years as the tournament's champion, and a 20 match unbeaten run at the Marshall Arena. In March he won the UK Open for the third time, beating Gerwyn Price 11–9 in the final. In his run through to the final, he hit his seventh career televised nine-darter, against Daryl Gurney in the semi-finals. In November he won the Players Championship Finals for the 6th time, beating Mervyn King 11–10 in the final.

2021
Van Gerwen opened up his 2021 World Championship campaign with a 3–1 win over Ryan Murray, averaging 108.98 points in the match. In the last 16, he battled back from 1–3 down to defeat Joe Cullen 4–3 and reach the quarter-finals. In the quarter-finals, he was whitewashed 0–5 by Dave Chisnall. This loss resulted in Van Gerwen dropping to number 2 in the world rankings, following Gerwyn Price's World Championship victory.

Van Gerwen then went on to lose in consecutive TV tournaments, losing in the Masters to Jonny Clayton and in the semi-finals of the UK Open to Luke Humphries. Van Gerwen then proceeded to top the Premier League but consequently went on to lose to eventual winner Jonny Clayton in the semi-finals.

Van Gerwen reached the final of PC20 but was beaten by Peter Wright in the tournament decider.

Van Gerwen had another great run in the World Matchplay but was beaten in the semi-finals by eventual winner Peter Wright.

2022

In his 2022 World Championship opener, Van Gerwen beat Chas Barstow before withdrawing prior to his third-round match with Chris Dobey after testing positive for COVID-19. In July, Van Gerwen reached the final of the World Matchplay for the first time in six years, where he defeated Gerwyn Price to win his third World Matchplay title, meaning that he had won at every PDC Premier Event that was held in 2022 at least three times.

Van Gerwen added to the World Matchplay with two further ranking TV titles by also winning the Wirkd Grand Prix for the sixth time, beating Nathan Aspinall in the final; and won the 2022 Players Championship Finals with victory over Rob Cross. He also won the 2022 Premier League.

2023

Van Gerwen returned to the World Championship as #3 seed. He opened his campaign with a 3–0 victory over Lewy Williams, before defeating Mensur Suljović 4–2 with an average of 107.66. A fourth round win over Dirk van Duijvenbode was followed by whitewash victories over Chris Dobey and Dimitri Van den Bergh, the latter with a 108.28 average, qualified Van Gerwen for his sixth World Darts Championship final, where he lost to Michael Smith 4–7.

Playing style
Van Gerwen leans quite a lot forward on the oche and throws at a very fast pace and scores extremely heavily meaning he is able to build up momentum over his opponents in a matter of seconds. When he does make a mistake he is usually able to confine it to history and refocus on the next leg. His playing style is instinctive and natural. He is known to hit purple patches during matches, where he can instantly elevate his game to exceptionally high levels.

He did so in winning the first three PDC major titles of his career, firstly in the 2012 Grand Prix final, where he came back from 1–4 down in sets to triumph 6–4 over Mervyn King, secondly in the 2013 Premier League final he came from 2–5 down to win five successive legs and eventually won 10–8, and thirdly winning seven consecutive legs against Phil Taylor in claiming the 2013 Players Championship Finals title.

He is also capable of taking out big checkouts to win matches when his opponent is well placed to win the leg.
The most striking examples of his ability to date include setting a televised average world record of 123.40 in the 2016 Premier League in a 7–1 victory over Michael Smith. Having started with four 11-dart legs or better in the first six legs, he missed double 18 three times for an average of over 130 which would have earned a shutout win had he found the double. He was also a double 12 away from hitting back-to-back nine-dart finishes in the 2013 World Championship semi-finals.

Five-time World Champion Eric Bristow has described him as fearless, and van Gerwen has said he is not scared of any player.

He celebrates important visits to the board with sudden short-range headbutts and a bouncing double fist-pump. Such exuberant celebrations have created negative reactions among some of his fellow players, with 2004 World Masters winner Mervyn King calling it disrespectful. It has been suggested that consistency could be the only thing that will stop van Gerwen from dominating the sport for years to come.

Personal life
In August 2014, van Gerwen married his longtime girlfriend, Daphne Govers. They have a daughter born in August 2017 and a son born in April 2020.

In December 2014, Sky Sports televised a one-hour documentary called "Mighty Mike" which charted his rise in darts as well as his life away from the sport. He is a supporter of the Dutch football club PSV Eindhoven.

In May 2018, he was awarded the Knight of the Order of Orange-Nassau Medal by his local Mayor on behalf of Willem-Alexander, King of the Netherlands.

World championship results

BDO
 2007: First round (lost to Gary Robson 2–3)

PDC
 2008: First round (lost to Phil Taylor 2–3)
 2009: Second round (lost to Phil Taylor 0–4)
 2010: Second round (lost to James Wade 2–4)
 2011: First round (lost to Mensur Suljović 1–3)
 2012: Third round (lost to Simon Whitlock 3–4)
 2013: Runner-up (lost to Phil Taylor 4–7)
 2014: Winner (beat Peter Wright 7–4)
 2015: Semi-finals (lost to Gary Anderson 3–6)
 2016: Third round (lost to Raymond van Barneveld 3–4)
 2017: Winner (beat Gary Anderson 7–3)
 2018: Semi-finals (lost to Rob Cross 5–6)
 2019: Winner (beat Michael Smith 7–3)
 2020: Runner-up (lost to Peter Wright 3–7)
 2021: Quarter-finals (lost to Dave Chisnall 0–5)
 2022: Third round (withdrew – COVID-19)
 2023: Runner-up (lost to Michael Smith 4–7)

Career finals

BDO major finals: 1 (1 title)

PDC major finals: 58 (45 titles, 13 runners-up)

PDC world series finals: 21 (13 titles, 8 runner-up)

PDC team finals: 4 (3 titles, 1 runner-up)

Performance timeline

BDO

PDC

PDC European Tour

Nine-dart finishes

Van Gerwen is the youngest player ever at 17 years and 298 days to throw a televised nine-darter.

High averages

Michael van Gerwen holds the highest televised average of 123.40 thrown in the 2016 Premier League against Michael Smith, getting a match dart for a 133.18 average in the seventh leg.

References

External links

1989 births
British Darts Organisation players
Dutch darts players
Living people
People from Boxtel
Sportspeople from North Brabant
Professional Darts Corporation current tour card holders
PDC world darts champions
World Series of Darts winners
UK Open champions
World Matchplay (darts) champions
World Grand Prix (darts) champions
Grand Slam of Darts champions
Players Championship Finals champions
European Championship (darts) champions
Masters (darts) champions
Premier League Darts champions
Champions League of Darts champions
Darts players who have thrown televised nine-dart games
PDC World Cup of Darts Dutch championship team